Trash is a 1970 American drama film directed and written by Paul Morrissey and starring Joe Dallesandro, Holly Woodlawn and Jane Forth. Dallesandro had previously starred in several other Andy Warhol/Paul Morrissey films such as The Loves of Ondine, Lonesome Cowboys, San Diego Surf, and Flesh.

Woodlawn made her screen debut in this film; director George Cukor famously instigated a write-in campaign to have her nominated for an Academy Award, but this did not materialize. Jane Forth, a 17-year-old model, also makes her debut in this film. She would shortly afterwards appear on the cover of Look magazine. The film also features other Warhol superstars such as Andrea Feldman and Geri Miller. The film features graphic scenes of intravenous drug use, sex, and frontal nudity.

Plot
Joe Smith, a heroin addict, is on a quest to score more drugs. Joe has problematic relationship with his on-off, sexually frustrated girlfriend, Holly Sandiago.

During the course of the day, Joe overdoses in front of an upper-class couple, attempts to fool welfare into approving his methadone treatment by having Holly fake a pregnancy, and frustrates the women in his life with his drug-induced impotence.

Cast
Joe Dallesandro as Joe
Holly Woodlawn as Holly
Jane Forth as Jane
Michael Sklar as Welfare Investigator
Geri Miller as Go-Go Dancer
Andrea Feldman as Rich Girl
Johnny Putnam as Boy From Yonkers
Bruce Pecheur as Jane's Husband
Diane Podlewski as Holly's Sister
Sissy Spacek as 'a girl who sits at the bar' (uncredited, but edited out of the final film)

Reception
Roger Ebert of the Chicago Sun-Times gave the film two-and-a-half stars out of four and wrote that it was "aware of its own ludicrousness ... The humor grows out of the incongruity of the actors, the situation, the movie, the audience. 'Trash' passes right through pornography and emerges on the other side." Vincent Canby of The New York Times called the film "true-blue movie-making, almost epic, funny and vivid, though a bit rotten at the core," concluding, "'Trash' is alive, but like the people in it, it continually parodies itself, and thus it represents a kind of dead end in filmmaking." Variety wrote that the film was "the most comprehensible, least annoying and possibly most commercial of a long line of quasi-porno features from 'Chelsea Girls' to 'Lonesome Cowboys.' Gene Siskel of the Chicago Tribune gave the film three stars out of four and wrote, "The Warhol-Morrissey world is a strange one, but in many ways, especially if taken in infrequent doses, a far more real world than the formula Hollywood drama or comedy. The actors are solidly in touch with their madness and can improvise with wit." Kevin Kelly of The Boston Globe slammed the film as "worthless excess of an amateur rank beneath consideration." Kevin Thomas of the Los Angeles Times wrote, "What Morrissey did in his first film 'Flesh' and now in this sometimes uproariously funny, sometimes desperately sad new work is to draw upon the far-out scene of the Warhol superstars and utilize the same basic setups of extended dialogs between two or three people." Stanley Kauffmann of The New Republic wrote- "Trash is disgusting, not for what it is on screen but for what it is in the minds of the people who made it".

Rotten Tomatoes gives the film a rating of 80% from 35 reviews with the consensus: "Diving into the lives of societal outcasts with an intent to shock, this export from the Warhol Factory will reek of trash for some but is a treasure for audiences who have a taste for outré fare."

See also
 List of American films of 1970

References

External links

1970 films
American drama films
American LGBT-related films
1970 drama films
1970 LGBT-related films
Films directed by Paul Morrissey
Films about heroin addiction
Transgender-related films
1970s English-language films
1970s American films